The Subject Was Roses is a 1968 American Metrocolor drama film directed by Ulu Grosbard. The screenplay by Frank D. Gilroy is based on his 1964 Pulitzer Prize-winning play of the same title.

The film stars Patricia Neal, Martin Sheen and Jack Albertson. Albertson won an Academy Award as best supporting actor and Neal was nominated as best actress.

Plot 
Returning to his Bronx home following World War II, Timmy Cleary (Martin Sheen) discovers his middle class parents have drifted apart and constantly quarrel at the least provocation. Once closer to his mother Nettie (Patricia Neal), the young veteran finds himself bonding with his salesman father, John (Jack Albertson), but he tries to remain neutral when intervening in their disputes.

En route home after a day trip to the family's summer cottage with his father, Timmy purchases a bouquet of roses and suggests John present them to his wife. Nettie is thrilled by his apparent thoughtfulness, and the three spend the evening nightclubbing in Manhattan. When an inebriated John, whose infidelities have already been revealed, attempts to make love to his wife later that night, Nettie rejects his advances, suggesting he go to "one of his whores", and breaks the vase of flowers, prompting her husband to reveal it really was Timmy who bought them.

The following morning, while John is at Sunday Mass, Timmy accuses his mother of trying to make him choose between his parents, and she goes out to allow both of them time to calm down. When she returns, she finds John arguing with their half-drunk son. Realizing the domestic situation is not likely to improve, Timmy announces he is leaving home, a decision his parents grudgingly accept. When he changes his mind, his father insists he stick to his plan, and the three eat breakfast together before he departs.

Cast 
 Patricia Neal as Nettie Cleary
 Jack Albertson as John Cleary
 Martin Sheen as Timmy Cleary
 Don Saxon as Nightclub M.C.
 Elaine Williams as Woman in Club
 Grant Gordon as Man in Restaurant

Production 
This was the first film directed by Ulu Grosbard, who had been nominated for the Tony Award for his direction of the 1964 Broadway production of Frank D. Gilroy's play. Joining him were original cast members Jack Albertson and Martin Sheen as John and Timmy Cleary; Patricia Neal replaced Irene Dailey in the role of Nettie.

The film was a significant comeback for Neal, who was recovering from a debilitating stroke she had suffered three years earlier and hadn't appeared on screen since In Harm's Way in 1965. During filming, the actress was beset with memory problems and physical limitations she struggled to overcome, and in her autobiography As I Am, she described the experience as a career milestone that convinced her she still was a good actress. She also discussed her effort to memorize a five-page monologue she was required to do in one take and her pride at doing so successfully.

The film was shot on location in New York City, Spring Lake, New Jersey, and Belmar, New Jersey (the Belmar Fishing Club).

The soundtrack includes "Who Knows Where the Time Goes?" (written by Sandy Denny) and "Albatross," both performed by Judy Collins (who wrote the latter song).

Critical reception 
Vincent Canby of The New York Times called the film "one of those . . . middle-class domestic dramas that — for various reasons — time has passed by, as it has the Philco Playhouse . . . The play has been brought to the screen with flat, fatal fidelity by Mr. Gilroy . . . Quite awkwardly (since it makes you aware of everything else you are not seeing), the one-set play has been opened up with several excursions outside the Bronx apartment. What's worse, Mr. Grosbard has retained the Broadway pace, which is particularly evident in the performances of Mr. Albertson and Mr. Sheen . . . The tempo of the acting often seems to be outrunning the movie itself . . . Miss Neal's presence . . . gives the movie an emotional impact it wouldn't otherwise have . . . She has, in fact, simply too much style and wit for this kind of monosyllabic nonsense."

Roger Ebert of the Chicago Sun-Times thought Gilroy's "extraordinary play . . . has been filmed with the greatest care, but it fails as a movie. It is hard to say exactly why. There's nothing obviously wrong, but when you walk out you don't feel as if you've been there. Something was missing." He added, "Part of the problem is with the actors, I think . . . Albertson and Sheen . . . talk loudly, their movements are too obvious, they are trying to project . . . Miss Neal, who knows the movies, is better suited to the medium. She holds back, she suggests more than she reveals, and when all three actors are on camera her performance makes the other two look embarrassingly theatrical. And there is where the movie fails."

Variety said, "The terrific writing, which top-notch performances make more magnificent, displays a wide range of human emotions, without recourse to cheap sensationalism or dialog. Grosbard's perceptive direction keeps the bickering and banter from becoming shrill histrionics."

TV Guide rated the film four stars, citing "the terrific acting, sharp writing, and outstanding direction from Grosbard" and adding, "Never does the emotion explode into oratory, so almost every scene has an underlying tension that continues to bubble."

The film has a 100% on Rotten Tomatoes.

Awards and nominations

See also
List of American films of 1968

References

External links 
 
 
 
 

1968 films
1968 directorial debut films
1968 drama films
1960s English-language films
American drama films
American films based on plays
Films about dysfunctional families
Films about veterans
Films directed by Ulu Grosbard
Films featuring a Best Supporting Actor Academy Award-winning performance
Films set in New York (state)
Films set in New York City
Films set in 1946
Films shot in New York City
Films shot in New Jersey
Metro-Goldwyn-Mayer films
1960s American films